Lance Daly is an Irish film director, screenwriter and producer.

Biography

Daly was born and raised in Dublin. He acted occasionally in his youth, including a role as a harmonica-playing extra in The Commitments (1991). He studied communications studies at Dublin City University.

Daly won an IFTA for his first major film, Kisses. According to Paul Whitington (Irish Independent), "Daly was one of a new generation of filmmakers who emerged in the mid-2000s determined to move beyond the stodgy, word-heavy traditions of Irish cinema. In films like Kisses (2008), he used visual lyricism and cinematic storytelling to great effect."

In 2013, together with Kirsten Sheridan and John Carney, he established The Factory, a multi-purpose space focusing on film production, in Dublin's docklands.

Black '47, a 2018 revenge film set during Ireland's Great Famine, was a commercial and critical success.

Filmography

References

External links

Alumni of Dublin City University
Irish film directors
Irish film producers
Irish screenwriters
Male actors from Dublin (city)
Date of birth missing (living people)
Living people
Year of birth missing (living people)